Thai Airways International Public Company Limited, trading as THAI is the flag carrier airline of the Kingdom of Thailand. Formed in 1961, the airline has its corporate headquarters in Vibhavadi Rangsit Road, Chatuchak district, Bangkok, and primarily operates from Suvarnabhumi Airport. THAI is a founding member of the Star Alliance. The airline is the second-largest shareholder of the low-cost carrier Nok Air with a 15.94 per cent stake (2020), and it launched a regional carrier under the name Thai Smile in the middle of 2012 using the new Airbus A320 aircraft.

Thai operate from its primary hub at Suvarnabhumi Airport, the airline serves 40 international destinations using a fleet of 46 aircraft, that consist of wide-body aircraft from both Boeing and Airbus, while the subsidiary Thai Smile operates narrow-body aircraft. As of 2013, services between Bangkok and Los Angeles were served via Incheon International Airport near Seoul. However, it ended its service to the US on 25 October 2015. Thai's route network is dominated by flights to Europe and Asia, though the airline serves two cities in Oceania. Thai was the first Asia-Pacific airline to serve Heathrow Airport. Among Asia-Pacific carriers, the company has one of the largest passenger operations in Europe. As of 2021, the longest route Thai operates is the Suvarnabhumi Airport (BKK) to Heathrow Airport (LHR) (5,950 mi). As of the end of 2019, 1,438 of its 22,054 employees were pilots.

History

Beginnings
Thai Airways International was founded in 1960 as a joint venture between Scandinavian Airlines System (SAS), which held a 30 percent share of the new company valued at two million Thai baht, and Thailand's domestic carrier, Thai Airways Company. The purpose of the joint venture was to create an international component for the domestic carrier Thai Airways Company. SAS provided operational, managerial, and marketing expertise, with training aimed at building a fully independent national airline in the shortest possible time. Thai nationals were gradually able to assume full managerial responsibility and the number of expatriate staff duly decreased, with expatriates accounting for less than one percent of staff based in Thailand in 1987.

The carrier's first revenue flight was on 1 May 1960, with flights to nine overseas Asian destinations from Bangkok.

The airline's first intercontinental services using Douglas DC-8s started in 1971 to Australia, and then to Europe the following year. A number of the larger Douglas DC-10 wide-body tri-jets was acquired in the late-1970s. Services to North America commenced in 1980.

On 1 April 1977, after 17 years of capital participation by SAS, the Thai government bought out the remaining 15 percent of SAS-owned shares and Thai became a state owned enterprise of the Thai government. As of 22 May 2020, the Thai Ministry of Finance is no longer the majority shareholder, having reduced its holding to 47.86 percent from 51.03 percent.

1980s and 1990s: merger with Thai Airways Company
On 1 April 1988, then-Prime Minister Gen. Prem Tinsulanonda, merged the international and domestic operations of the two companies to form the present company, Thai Airways International, to have a single national carrier. On 25 June 1991, the reconfigured company listed its shares on the Stock Exchange of Thailand and offered them to the public. The Thai public offering of shares is the largest ever undertaken in the country.

In 1997 Thai Airways planned a privatization program, the first in Thai history.

On 14 May 1997, THAI, along with Lufthansa, Air Canada, SAS, and United Airlines, founded the world's first and largest airline alliance, Star Alliance.

The genesis of Thai's later financial difficulties has been attributed to actions taken in the 1990s when Thai Airways began "buying every type of plane that was being manufactured." Different models meant that the airline had to train an army of technicians to keep differing airframes and engines from both General Electric and Rolls-Royce airworthy, significantly inflating maintenance costs.

2000s: Airline brand renewal and financial difficulties

In the first decade of the 21st century, Thai Airways continued its route network expansion with new services to Chengdu, Busan, Chennai, Xiamen, Milan, Moscow, Islamabad, Hyderabad, Johannesburg, and Oslo.

Using the Airbus A340-500 fleet it acquired in 2005, Thai commenced non-stop flights between Bangkok and New York, its first non-stop service to North America. The airline later converted an existing one-stop service (via Tokyo) to Los Angeles into a non-stop flight using the same aircraft type. Citing very high fuel costs, Thai discontinued the New York service in July 2008, even though the airline had been able to fill 80 percent of the seats. The service to Los Angeles was again reverted to one-stop service via Seoul on 1 May 2012, leaving the airline without a non-stop service between Thailand and North America. The A340s used were phased out, replaced by the Boeing 777-200ER for the Bangkok–Seoul–Los-Angeles route. Although the previous A340 used for non-stop services was not subject to ETOPS, the phasing in of the 777 with one-stop service (with the 330 minute rule) would be indefinite for years to come; the airline had no plans to pursue newer North America destinations (e.g., Houston) or purchase the Boeing 747-8 for transpacific routes since is operating the Airbus A380.

The 2000s also saw Thai expand its Thai airport network beyond its Bangkok hub. The airline launched non-stop flights from Phuket to Tokyo–Narita, Seoul–Incheon and Hong Kong.

During the late-2000s, Thai's growth was hampered by a combination of internal and external factors, including a spike in fuel prices, domestic political conflict in Thailand, and the global economic crisis of the late-2000s. In 2008, after achieving profitability for the previous 40 years, Thai recorded a loss for the first time in its history of around 21 billion baht (US$675 million). The airline blamed high fuel costs and Thailand's political turmoil. As of Q2 2009, after a series of restructuring initiatives, including a two-year deferral of its Airbus A380 deliveries, the carrier returned to a net profit of 2.5 billion baht.

Thai's need for reform became evident in the first decade of the 21st century, but reforms, when they came, were invariably cut short. Thai's problems were threefold: ineffective leadership at the top; inexperienced boards; and a coddled union. Piyasvasti Amranand took Thai's helm in October 2009 after serving as energy minister. At Thai, he is still regarded as a true reformer, imposing salary cuts for senior executives as part of his drive to reduce costs. He was voted out by the board in 2012 for what may have been political reasons. The board of directors was, after the 2014 Thai coup d'état, packed with military brass. Five civilian members were purged and replaced with five Royal Thai Air Force (RTAF) generals, as was the board's chairman. The appointments ended Thai's policy of only appointing technocrats to the board. Three RTAF generals remain on the 2020 board; they have no experience running listed companies or restructuring loss-making airlines. Concomitantly, employees at Thai enjoyed an overprotected status. Salary increases based on length of employment led to senior captains earning more than the CEO.

2010s: Fleet renewal and route expansion
While celebrating its fiftieth anniversary in 2010, Thai, led by its president, Piyasvasti Amranand, drafted new plans for the airline's future, including aircraft fleet renewal and an upgrade of existing services. Thai placed orders for a number of aircraft, including the Boeing 787 and Airbus A350, and it launched a refurbishment of its Boeing 747 and 777 cabins. Mindful of rising fuel costs, the airline phased-out its most inefficient aircraft, including its Airbus A340-500s. The airline took delivery of its first Airbus A380 aircraft in the second half of 2012, intending to eventually deploy the aircraft on its core European routes.

THAI resumed network expansion with the resumption of flights to Brussels, in addition to a new non-stop flight from Stockholm and Copenhagen to Phuket. At the same time, the Greek debt crisis caused Thai to suspend its services to Athens.

Thai expects to be the first carrier in Asia to fly commercial flights using biofuels. The carrier launched the initiative with experimental flights in December 2011 as part of its Corporate Social Responsibility program, otherwise known as "Travel Green". Thai hopes to stimulate sustained biofuel production in Thailand by working with Thai government agencies and regional corporate partners, such as PTT Public Company Limited. The effort aims to reduce carbon dioxide emissions in regional air travel as well as position Thailand to be the "bio hub" of Asia.

In April 2015, after an audit of the Thai Department of Civil Aviation, Thailand was downgraded from Category 1 to Category 2 due to negative audit results from the International Civil Aviation Organization (ICAO). On 1 December 2015, the US Federal Aviation Administration (FAA) announced their reassessment of the safety rating for Thailand, downgrading it from a Category 1 to Category 2 country. The FAA stated, "U.S. and Thai aviation officials have a long-standing cooperative relationship and both our countries work continuously to meet the challenge of ensuring aviation safety. A Category 2 International Aviation Safety Assessment (IASA) rating means that the country either lacks laws or regulations necessary to oversee air carriers in accordance with minimum international standards, or its civil aviation authority—a body equivalent to the FAA for aviation safety matters—is deficient in one or more areas, such as technical expertise, trained personnel, record-keeping, or inspection procedures. With a Category 2 rating, Thailand's air carriers can continue existing routes to the United States but they won't be allowed to establish new routes to the United States."

The European Aviation Safety Agency (EASA) declined to blacklist any Thai carriers following a review of certain carriers in November 2015. Thai later received third country operator (TCO) certification from the EU, effective 15 December 2015, authorizing the carrier to continue flying to the EU for the foreseeable future.

In July 2015, Thai announced the planned cancellation of service to Los Angeles after 25 October 2015, marking the end of US service.

In June 2016, as a result of its restructuring plan, Thai announced it would commence thrice-weekly Tehran service. However, the service ended on 28 February 2018. The airline also considered a return to the US using Boeing 787-9 by 2017. However, Charamporn Jothikastira, THAI president, turned down the possibility of returning to Los Angeles or New York City due to losses in the past. Instead, Thai considered other cities such as San Francisco and Seattle. While Thai Smile, its subsidiary, planned new regional routes such as Cebu, Medan, Surabaya, Chandigarh, Shantou and Tianjin.

In August 2016, Thai introduced a new route network management system. Following implementation, flight schedules were synchronized, allowing international passengers to transit via Bangkok Suvarnabhumi more conveniently. Thai planned to adjust thirteen route schedules, mainly in Japan, Australia, and India. Routes to Perth and Brisbane were announced.

In February 2023, it has been announced that subsidiary Thai Smile will be dissolved as a separate entity and merged into Thai Airways by 2024 in an effort to reduce losses.

Branding

Safety video

The current safety video was introduced in 2018. Sueb Nakhasathien Foundation president Rungsit Kanjanavanit stated his belief that the video does not sufficiently reflect Thai culture as the animals and flowers used are more commonly found in South America.

The launch of Thai Smile

As part of THAI's broader growth strategy in the region, THAI launched a regional carrier with light-premium services, Thai Smile, which operates the narrow-bodied Airbus A320-200 on regional and domestic routes. The new airline began commercial operations in July 2012, after its first A320s were received. As of September 2020, Thai Smile files to 31 destinations and a fleet of 20 aircraft with Chiang Mai International Airport being its focus city.

By September 2016, Thai Smile, Thai's subsidiary announced new services to Gaya, Varanasi, Jaipur, and Lucknow in India marking the expansion of Thai's Asian network.

In the fourth quarter of 2016, Thai Smile vowed to resume its suspended routes and Thai's terminated regional routes to Da Nang, Kota Kinabalu, Luang Prabang and Mandalay. Also the airline has considered launching new services to Hangzhou and Zhengzhou.

Liveries and logos

In 2006, Thai Airways moved its hub to the new Suvarnabhumi Airport. Coinciding with the arrival of new aircraft in the mid-2000s, as well as its new hub in Bangkok, the airline launched a brand renewal by introducing new aircraft livery, new aircraft seating, and revamped ground and air service.

The logo on the tail fin shows the traditional Thai greeting gesture (wai), and the curves represents traditional Thai architecture of the decorative structure called lamyong that are common on temple roofs to distinguish different tiers in the structure. The gold represents the colour of Thai Temples, while the magenta signifies magnolia blossom, where finally the purple represents the Thai Orchid - a colour that is used throughout the airline from uniforms to interior cabin colour schemes.

Special liveries
In 1999, THAI first painted the Suphannahong Royal Barge aircraft livery on its Boeing 747-4D7 (HS-TGJ) aircraft, royally bestowed the name “Haripunchai” on the occasion of the Sixth Cycle Birthday of King Rama IX.

To mark the Coronation of the King Rama X Thai Airways used a Boeing 777-300 (HS-TKF) to put the Suphannahong Royal Barge as its aircraft livery, where it will be featured till the end of 2022

Corporate affairs

Financials
As of October 2019, Thai's accumulated debt amounted to more than 100 billion baht, prompting a deputy transport minister to question "...how serious the airline's executives were in dealing with the worsening financial situation." Thai reported a net loss of 4.68 billion baht in the third quarter of 2019 and a 10.91 billion baht net loss for the first nine months of 2019. Thai's president lamented that, "...such losses were normal for airlines amid fierce competition and price dumping to win customers," a statement contradicted by the performance of other airlines in the region such as VietJet Air.

In 2019, Thai's net loss widened to 12.2 billion baht, up from Thai's net loss of 11.6 billion baht in 2018 and 2.11 billion in 2017.

For calendar year 2017, Thai posted revenues of 190,535 million baht, net income of (2,072) million baht, and total assets of 280,775 million baht. In the first half of 2018, Thai reported a net loss of 381 million baht.

At the commencement of 2014, Thai was subject to a rumor that the company would declare bankruptcy in May 2014. Listed on the Thai stock exchange, the company was formerly a state enterprise—until 22 May 2020—in which the finance ministry held a stake of up to 51 per cent. In a statement to the media, Chokchai Panyayong, the airways' senior executive vice-president and acting president, stated: "Thai has never once defaulted. Despite its loss in the third quarter of last year, the company still has high liquidity and has a clear plan for debt repayment." He further explained that the carrier's loss of 6.35 billion baht in the third quarter of last year was the result of the company's unsuccessful plan to attract more customers. Thai's financial loss for 2014 was reported to be at 15.6 billion baht (US$479 million), 3.6 billion baht higher than the previous year. Thai blamed declining tourist arrivals from North Asia owing to political unrest in Thailand during the year, but capacity figures from Flightglobal's Innovata Network Data service suggest that Europe was probably an even bigger drain on the bottom line during the year.

2018 recovery plan
Thai's new management team has set itself the goal of returning to "sustainable profitability" by 2022 as well as joining the ranks of the world's top five airlines. The centerpiece of its turnaround plan is its proposed 100 billion baht purchase of 23 new aircraft. THAI's chairman pointed to its aging fleet as being expensive to maintain. THAI's 89 aircraft have an average age of 9.3 years compared with competitor Singapore Airlines average age of 7.6 years. Thai's chairman said the company has not yet determined "...what aircraft and type we need to buy because we have yet to finalize financing."

Thai's recovery plans include teaming up with state enterprises Airports of Thailand PCL (AOT) and Krung Thai Bank (KTB) to help drive the carrier to profitability. The team's "first task" is to deliver more tourists to 55 "second-tier" provinces. The Tourism Authority of Thailand (TAT) will assist the team by creating a new campaign, "More Local", to drive tourism to less visited corners of the nation. AOT, which operates Thailand's six international airports, will invest 220 billion baht in infrastructure to increase airport capacity from 2018's 80 million passengers to 185 million in ten years. KTB's contribution to the effort consists of creating new payment solutions for tourists and ramping up travel promotions.

Management Issues
Political interference, corruption and abuse of authority have been persistent issues in Thai's management. Speaking at the World Economic Forum on East Asia, former president Piyasvasti Amranand, who had been abruptly dismissed in May 2012, cited Thai's procurement of A340-500s (three of which had since been grounded) as examples of mismanagement influenced by corruption and political meddling, resulting in operational losses.

At an extraordinary board meeting held on 27 March 2020, Chakkrit Parapuntakul, Second Vice Chairman, was appointed as acting president of Thai Airways effective 11 April 2020.

Debt restructuring
The Thai government stepped in to provide THAI with a 50bn baht loan guarantee in April 2020 and reaffirmed the airline's status as a state enterprise. The move was taken in the absence of a "get well" plan. A week later, the bailout loan was withdrawn and the cabinet replaced it with a plan to have Thai file with the Central Bankruptcy Court for debt restructuring. As of March 2021, the airline is 410 billion baht in debt and 13,000 creditors. This include customers who simply bought tickets and not being refunded by Thai Airways. Most of those customers have waited for close to 2 years and still not being refunded although Thai Airways keeps selling new tickets. Its main creditors are the state-owned Krungthai and Government Savings Banks. The 50bn baht loan it had sought from the government would have kept it afloat for only five months. An 80bn baht capital infusion would have been needed later.

Thai Airways lost its state enterprise status on 22 May 2020 when the Finance Ministry sold off a 3.17% stake in Thai to the Vayupak 1 Fund, thus reducing its former majority shareholding to 47.86%. Thai has appealed to the government for help to forestall the seizure of its aircraft by foreign creditors. The airline sought government help because it has contracts and legal obligations that can only be resolved by the state. These issues must be dealt with before Thai enters debt rehabilitation. Concurrently, investigators are looking into anomalies in Thai ticket sales in 2019. The Transport Ministry reported that Thai ticket sales and freight revenues totalled 140bn baht in 2019, yet Thai had 25.4m passengers at an average ticket price of 6,081 baht, a total of 154.5bn baht. A senior prosecutor, Wanchai Roujanavong, had earlier warned that, "...the proposed rehabilitation of Thai Airways International [is] the opening of a Pandora's Box, which will expose extensive corruption in the ailing national flag carrier which has hitherto been hidden from the public."

On September 14, 2020, the Central Bankruptcy Court has given approval for THAI to enter rehabilitation. THAI has submitted the rehabilitation plan on 2 March 2021. The airline nominated the airline's independent director Piyasvasti Amranand and Chakkrit Parapuntakul, the company's second vice chairman as rehabilitation plan administrators, while the creditors will meet on 12 May 2021 to vote on the rehabilitation plan, and the court is expected to decide whether to endorse the plan between June and July 2021.

On 15 June 2021, the Central Bankruptcy Court set the hearing to read out the court's order with regard to the consideration of THAI's Business Rehabilitation Plan. After receiving two objections against the Business Rehabilitation Plan of THAI, the Planner's clarification, and the official receiver's opinion regarding several issues, the Central Bankruptcy Court granted an order to approve THAI's Business Rehabilitation Plan as well as the amended plan following the acceptance resolution of the creditors' meeting on 19 May 2021. As a result, the Plan Administrator nominations whose names were proposed according to the Business Rehabilitation Plan and the amended plan, i.e. Mr. Piyasvasti Amranand, Mr. Pornchai Thiravet, Mr. Siri Jirapongphan, Mr. Kraisorn Barameeauychai, and Mr. Chansin Treenuchagron, has become the Plan Administrators who are authorized to operate THAI's business and implement the plan.

On 1 July 2022, the Plan Administrator submitted the petition for plan amendment to the official receiver.  On 1 September 2022, the Official Receiver held the creditors’ meeting via electronic means (e-Meeting). The creditors who hold 78.59 percent of the total claims of the creditors, who attended the meeting and cast votes, accepted the amendment of the Business Reorganization Plan that the Plan Administrator submitted to the Official Receiver.  On 20 October 2022, the Central Bankruptcy Court issued an order approving the proposal for the Plan amendment of the Company. 

On 21 October 2022, THAI informed the resignation of the Plan Administrator, effective as of October 21, 2022 as follows: 1. Mr. Kraisorn Barameeauychai 2. Mr. Siri Jirapongphan

Corruption 
On 20 August 2020, then Deputy Transport Minister Thaworn Senniam announced some Thai Airways employees became unusually rich from the 2003-2004 10 Airbus A340's procurement deal and other mismanaged projects, according to a police-led investigation team set up by the Ministry of Transport. The team is forwarding its findings to the National Anti-Corruption Commission and has been informed by the Council of State that it must shut down due to a technicality.

Rolls-Royce engine procurement
In January 2017, a four-year investigation by the UK's Serious Fraud Office (SFO) determined that aircraft engine-maker Rolls-Royce had paid bribes to Thai Airways employees and government employees in Thailand to secure orders for the Rolls-Royce T800 engine for its Boeing 777-200s. Rolls-Royce admitted to the charge and agreed to pay penalties. The illicit payments of US$36.38M took place between 1991 and 2005. Bribes were paid in three s:

 1 June 1991 – 30 June 1992: Rolls-Royce paid US$18.8M
 1 March 1992 – 31 March 1997: Rolls-Royce paid US$10.38M
 1 April 2004 – 28 February 2005: Rolls-Royce paid US$7.2M

The government rejected calls for Prime Minister Prayut Chan-o-cha to use his Section 44 powers to cut through red tape in the investigation of the Rolls-Royce bribery scandal. Response from the Thai government's National Anti-Corruption Commission to information provided by the SFO, is said to be "tepid" and "...could be more embarrassing than the scandal itself."

On 28 August, Thaworn Senneam announced the findings of a House panel which found evidence of bribes of a minimum of 5%, or 2.6 billion baht, on contracts in payments to officials, politicians, and THAI executives. Thaworn alleged that Rolls-Royce paid 245 million baht in bribes through middlemen, and irregular expenses and overtime payments to staff and senior management, with excessive payments to executives costing. On 1 September, the Transport Ministry formally submitted the findings of the probe into alleged irregularities to the Finance Ministry, Prime Minister's Office, and National Anti Corruption Commission for further action.

Destinations

, Thai Airways International flies to 40 destinations.

Alliances
Thai Airways International is a member and one of the five founding members of Star Alliance which was founded on 14 May 1997. As of February 2020 Thai Smile is a connecting member for the alliance.

Codeshare agreements
Thai Airways International codeshares with the following airlines:

 Air Canada
 Air India
 Air New Zealand
 All Nippon Airways
 Air Macau
 Asiana Airlines
 Austrian Airlines
 Bangkok Airways
 Brussels Airlines
 Egyptair
 El Al
 Emirates
 EVA Air
 Gulf Air
 Lao Airlines
 Lufthansa
 Malaysia Airlines
 Oman Air
 Pakistan International Airlines
 Royal Brunei Airlines
 Scandinavian Airlines
 Shenzhen Airlines
 Singapore Airlines
 Swiss International Air Lines
 TAP Air Portugal
 Thai Smile (Subsidiary)
 Turkish Airlines
 United Airlines

Fleet

Thai Airways operates a fleet of widebody aircraft from both Airbus and Boeing, totalling 46 aircraft as of November 2022.

Aircraft maintenance centres 
Thai maintains three maintenance centres, at U-Tapao International Airport, Don Mueang International Airport, and Suvarnabhumi Airport. The centers service aircraft belonging to other airlines in addition to Thai aircraft.

Thai Technical 
Thai Technical is certified internationally by the Federal Aviation Administration, the Joint Aviation Authorities, the European Aviation Safety Agency Part-145 Maintenance Organisation, and the Japan Civil Aviation Bureau for facilities at Don Mueang International Airport and Suvarnabhumi Airport. It has also received its Requalifier Identification Certificate from the United States Department of Transportation for its operations at U-Tapao International Airport and Suvarnabhumi Airport.

It is certified domestically by the Department of Civil Aviation (Thailand) for all three of its facilities in Thailand.

On 27 February 1998, the department received its ISO 9002 certification from Bureau Veritas Quality International, with ISO 14001 certification granted by the same agency on 16 March 2001.

Hygiene 
Thai initiated a program entitled "The Most Hygienic In-Cabin Environment Program" with an emphasis on air quality, surface cleanliness, and food safety. The program includes removal of all in-flight disposable materials after flights, sterilization and fumigation of all cabin equipment, and inspection of the air-circulation system. A special audit process is also carried out for the cleaning and sanitization of aircraft systems by a team of specialists. These measures are applied to the entire Thai fleet.

Thai was the first airline to install hospital-grade air-filter True HEPA, capable of intercepting up to 99.99 per cent of dust particles and microorganisms on every flight. The World Health Organization awarded the airline a plaque for the implementation of its in-cabin management system in 2004. It was the first award of its kind to be presented to a private organization.

Cabin services

Royal First Class (First Class) 
Thai's Royal First Class is currently not available. The airline's last 3 Boeing 777-300ERs on order are scheduled to be fitted with a Royal First Class cabin.

Royal Silk Class (Business Class)
Thai's Royal Silk Class seats have been installed on all of Thai Airways' aircraft. Prior to refurbishment, Royal Silk seats on Boeing 777-300ERs are sold as premium economy class seats on flights to Copenhagen, Oslo, Stockholm and Moscow. A new set of Royal Silk seats are available on THAI's Boeing 777-300ERs, Boeing 787-8s, and Airbus A350-900s. After the delivery of the new 787-9s to THAI, the Zodiac Cirrus or Reverse Herringbone seats are now available on board the new aircraft.

Economy Class 
Thai's Economy Class offers between  seat pitch depending on the aircraft type. Personal screens with AVOD are present on the Airbus A350-900, Boeing 777-200ER/-300ER, Boeing 787-8/-9 aircraft.

Royal Orchid Plus 
Royal Orchid Plus is Thai's frequent flyer program. It has a membership of over two million people. There are two types of miles which can be accrued with a Royal Orchid Plus account: Eligible Qualifying Miles (EQM) on flights of THAI and its subsidiaries and codeshare and Star Alliance partners as well as Qualifying Miles (Q Miles) are the miles flown as well as the bonus miles earned from travel in particular classes of service on THAI and Star Alliance airlines. Royal Orchid Plus miles are earned based on the paid class of travel. There are four tiers in the Royal Orchid Plus program: Member, Silver, Gold and Platinum, depending on the Q Miles earned in one calendar year.

Sponsorship
Thai Airways signed a sponsorship agreement with English Football League (EFL). The new agreement will see Thai Airways have a digital and in-stadia presence at every one of the five EFL Finals that are held at Wembley Stadium throughout the 2017/18. As of 2020, Thai has been given a year extension on the partnership. Thai Airways also has signed a sponsorship agreement with Australian Rugby Team Melbourne Rebels and the Australian A-League soccer club Western Sydney Wanderers

Accidents and incidents 
30 June 1967: Thai Airways International Flight 601, a Sud Aviation SE-210 Caravelle III (HS-TGI, Chiraprapa), crashed in the sea while landing at Kai Tak Airport during a typhoon, killing 24 of 80 on board.
9 July 1969: A Sud Aviation Caravelle III (HS-TGK, Tepamart) landed with difficulty at Don Mueang International Airport during a thunderstorm; all 75 on board survived, but the aircraft was written off. The aircraft may have been caught by a downdraft.
10 May 1973: A Douglas DC-8-33 (HS-TGU, Srisubhan) overran the runway on landing at Tribhuvan International Airport in Kathmandu. All 100 passengers and 10 crew on board survived, but one person on the ground died.
The aircraft was damaged by the explosion but was repaired and returned to service.
10 November 1990: Thai Airways International Flight 305, an Airbus A300B4 flying from Yangon to Bangkok was hijacked by four Burmese students demanding to be taken to India. The aircraft diverted to Calcutta where the hijackers surrendered after negotiations. The hijackers demanded restoration of democracy in Burma.
All 113 on board (99 passengers and 14 crew) died. The accident was caused by pilot error and loss of situation awareness in inclement weather.
22 October 1994: An Airbus A300B4-100 (HS-THO, Srichulalak) was written off after it was struck by an out-of-control Thai Airways MD-11 (HS-TMD, Phra Nakhon) that was performing an engine run-up at Bangkok International Airport.
3 March 2001: Thai Airways International Flight 114, a Boeing 737-400 (HS-TDC, Narathiwat), bound for Chiang Mai from Bangkok, was destroyed by an explosion of the center wing tank resulting from ignition of the flammable fuel-air mixture in the tank while the aircraft was parked at the gate in Bangkok. The source of the ignition energy for the explosion could not be determined with certainty, but the most likely source was an explosion originating at the center wing tank pump as a result of running the pump in the presence of metal shavings and a fuel-air mixture. One crew member died.
8 September 2013: Thai Airways International Flight 679, an Airbus A330-300, (HS-TEF, Song Dao), arriving from Guangzhou Baiyun International Airport (CAN) had a runway excursion from runway 19L while landing at Bangkok's Suvarnabhumi Airport (BKK), with extensive damage to the airplane and the runway. All passengers and crew were evacuated with no serious injuries.  Preliminary investigation determined the cause of the incident to be the right landing gear collapsing as a result of a damaged bogie. In the aftermath of the accident, Thai Airways had the logos of the aircraft painted over in black, prompting widespread criticism of attempted cover-up. An airline official initially said that the practice was part of the "crisis communication rule" recommended by Star Alliance. This was denied by the group, and Thai Airways later clarified that the "de-identifying" of aircraft was its own practice and not Star Alliance policy. The controversy prompted discussion over the appropriateness and effectiveness of the practice as a brand-protection policy. The aircraft was damaged beyond repair and written off as a hull loss. The airframe has since been converted to a roadside attraction called Airways Land, featuring a cafe and event space, on Mittraphap Road in Sida District, Nakhon Ratchasima Province.

See also
 List of airlines of Thailand
 Transport in Thailand

References

External links

Airlines of Thailand
 
Airlines established in 1960
Association of Asia Pacific Airlines
Companies based in Bangkok
Companies listed on the Stock Exchange of Thailand
Government-owned airlines
Government-owned companies of Thailand
SET50 Index
Star Alliance
Thai companies established in 1960